Ishq (Urdu: عشق,  literal English translation: "love") is the sixth studio album and the ninth overall album of the Pakistani sufi rock band, Junoon. The album was released on January 1, 2001 and was released by the title of Andaz outside Pakistan.

Background
The album topped the charts in Pakistan as well as in the Gulf and South Asia, with its first single entitled "Zamane ke Andaz" (Saqi-Nama) which made it to #1 in the Gulf, and to #5 on the Asian charts. On its official website, Junoon has stated that the band tried to get out of the Sufi rock genre during the album's release.

Track listing
All music written & composed by Salman Ahmad and Sabir Zafar. Except for "Zamane Ke Andaz" (Saqi-Nama) which was written by Allama Iqbal.

Personnel
All information is taken from the CD.

Junoon
 Ali Azmat - vocals 
 Salman Ahmad- lead guitar, backing vocals
Brian O'Connell - bass guitar, backing vocals

Additional musicians
Female vocals on "Azadi" by Samina Ahmad
Drums played by Jay Dittamo & John "Gumby" Louis Pinto
Orchestral Arrangements by Paul Schwartz

Production
Produced by John Alec & Salman Ahmad
Recorded & Mixed at Grandview Studios in New York City, United States
Mastered by Scheherazade Qassim Hassan
Engineered & Mixed John Alec
Tracks recorded at the Roskilde Festival, produced by Neils Ekner
Tracks recorded at the Roskilde Festival, recorded & mixed by Ossian Rhyner

References

External links
 Junoon's Official Website

2001 albums
Junoon (band) albums
Urdu-language albums